Grand Prix Cholet-Pays de la Loire is a single-day road bicycle race held annually in March in Cholet, France. Since 2005, the race is organized as a 1.1 event on the UCI Europe Tour. It is often called Primavera of the Mauges due to its similarities with Belgian semi-classics because of the wind, short hills and some rain on the way to Cholet.

Name of the race
1978–1987: Grand Prix de Mauléon-Moulins
1988–1989: Grand Prix de Cholet-Mauléon-Moulins
1990–2007: Grand Prix de Cholet – Pays de Loire

Winners

References

External links